Joseph Booth may refer to:

 Joseph Booth (missionary) (1851–1932), British missionary to Africa
 Joseph Booth (rugby union) (1873–1958), Welsh-born rugby union forward
 Joseph Booth (bishop) (1887–1965), archbishop of Melbourne
 Joseph Booth (actor) (died 1797), English tradesman, actor and inventor
 Joseph Booth & Bros, UK manufacturer of cranes 1847-present

See also
 Seeley Booth aka Seeley Joseph Booth, a fictional character from the Fox television program Bones

Booth, Joseph